Françoise Garner (born 17 October 1933) is a French soprano.

Life 
Born in Nérac (Lot-et-Garonne), she studied composition at the conservatoire de Paris with Marcel Samuel-Rousseau and then worked at the Accademia Nazionale di Santa Cecilia of Rome for six years, studying singing with Rachele Maragliano-Mori, later at the Mozarteum University Salzburg in Austria with Rudolf Baumgartner.

She made her debut at the Opéra-Comique in 1963 with the premiere of Menotti's The Last Savage. Other roles included Rosina in The Barber of Seville, the title role in Lakmé, Olympia in Les Contes d'Hoffmann,  Leïla in Les Pêcheurs de perles. At the Paris Opera, she sang the title role in Lucia di Lammermoor and Gilda in Rigoletto. In 1971, she sang the Queen of the night at the Festival d'Aix-en-Provence. In 1970 her international career began: Metropolitan Opera of New York, La Scala of Milan (in 1977 she sang Marguerite in Gounod's Faust), Geneva, Rio de Janeiro, Liceu of Barcelone,  including Roméo et Juliette and Madame Butterfly in the Verona Arena.

A coloratura at first, she became a lyric soprano (La traviata, Il trovatore) and finally a dramatic soprano (Tosca). She  recorded Bellini's Norma. (ODB Opéra)

Selected discography 
 Vincenzo Bellini, Norma - recorded in 1997.
 Discography (Discogs)

References

External links 
 Une cantatrice néracaise sur les scènes du monde Sud Ouest
 Complete chronology
 Francoise Garner - E'lindo e civetti... Van la casa e l'albergo (Rita - Gaetano Donizetti) (YouTube)

1933 births
Living people
People from Nérac
Conservatoire de Paris alumni
French operatic sopranos
20th-century French women opera singers